The Adam Art Gallery (in Māori: Te Pātaka Toi) is a purpose-built arts gallery located in the Kelburn Campus of Victoria University of Wellington in Wellington, New Zealand.

History

On 15 July 1997, Jenny Harper and Tina Barton started the proceedings to establish the gallery.

The building was formally opened 21 September 1999, by Sir Michael Hardie Boys, Governor General of New Zealand.

The gallery's benefactors include Victoria University of Wellington Foundation, as well as Denis and Verna Adam (who the gallery was subsequently named after following their donation of NZ$1 million in 1998.

The gallery was designed by Ian Athfield. It was built between the three university buildings the Old Kirk Building, the Hunter Building and the Student Union Building (on top of the existing "Culliford stair").

The stairs were built in the mid-1960s to link different buildings, but had to be abandoned for safety reasons. The building includes different gallery spaces that hold exhibitions, performances, lectures and talks.

Exhibitions

Selected exhibitions held at the gallery have included solo projects by Joseph Kosuth (USA), Joseph Grigely (USA), Fernanda Gomes (Brazil), Zhang Huan (PRC), Destiny Deacon (Australia), Gunther Uecker (Germany), João Maria Gusmão & Pedro Paiva (Portugal), Brett Graham (NZ), Mark Adams (NZ), Gavin Hipkins (NZ), Darcy Lange (NZ), Vivian Lynn (NZ), Pauline Rhodes (NZ) and Billy Apple (UK/US/NZ).

Selected curated shows at the gallery have include Face to Face: Contemporary Art From Taiwan; Play: Recent Video from Australia and New Zealand; Concrete Horizons: Contemporary Art from China; Breaking Ice: Revisioning Antarctica; 40yearsvideoart.de, and The Subject Now.

The Adam Art Gallery's admission is complimentary.

References

External links

 
 Take Five: Including We Will Work With You! and NZ Sculpture Onshore, New Zealand Listener

Museums in Wellington City
Victoria University of Wellington
Event venues established in 1997
Art museums and galleries in New Zealand
1997 establishments in New Zealand
Art museums established in 1997
1990s architecture in New Zealand